Broomielaw railway station co-served the hamlet of Broomielaw, County Durham, England, from 1856 to 1965 on the Darlington and Barnard Castle Railway.

History 
The station was opened on 8 July 1856 by the Darlington and Barnard Castle Railway. It was situated on the west side of a minor road. It was first used privately by the Bowes-Lyon family who lived in Streatlam Castle. It was also used by children for excursions. It opened to the public on 9 June 1942, although it only showed as publicly opened in 1944 handbook of stations. It was shown as Broomilaw in Clinker's papers of 1945. To the north was a siding controlled by a signal boz to the west. The station closed to passengers on 30 November 1964 and closed to goods on 5 April 1965.

References 

Disused railway stations in County Durham
Railway stations in Great Britain opened in 1856
Railway stations in Great Britain closed in 1964
1856 establishments in England
1965 disestablishments in England